Stirling Macedonia Football Club (formerly West Perth Macedonia, Stirling Lions) is an Australian soccer club based in Perth, Western Australia, who will be competing in 2023 in the National Premier Leagues Western Australia.

History

Stirling Macedonia Soccer Club evolved with the history of the Macedonian Australian community of Western Australia. The Club has been through a number of name changes and directions in its forty-year history. They were known as West Perth Macedonia in the 1970s and early 1980s, winning the League Title in its third year of State League.

In 1986, the club changed its name to Stirling Macedonia with a move to Macedonia Park. That year, the Club represented the Soccer Federation of Western Australia against Adelaide City in the NANDA Cup in front of a crowd of approximately 5,000 people. During the 1980s and 1990s they were one of the most powerful soccer clubs in Western Australia, winning six league premierships. These included the 1983, 1984 and 1985 three-peat, as well as victories in 1987, 1994 and 1995. 

In 1999, the club changed their name to the Stirling Lions Soccer Club as a result of the National Club Identity Policy, which forced references to ethnicities to be removed from club names. 

In 2013, Stirling won their first league title since 1995. In October 2014, Cane Spaseski (also known as Sani) was appointed club president. With Sani at the helm, the club quickly grew to become a club of choice. Under the tutelage of Technical Director Richard Changadzo with an elite group of coaching staff, in 2016 the club’s junior NPL teams flourished and finished top 5 overall in 2016/17. Richard departed from the club after 2018, and Sani also stepped down.

In 2019, the National Club Identity Policy that had forced the club to change its name to Stirling Lions was revoked, and the club announced a return to the original name of Stirling Macedonia for the 2021 season. In their first season since the return to the name of Stirling Macedonia, the club won the State League 1 and achieved promotion back into the NPL after their relegation in the 2019 season. In their first season back in the top flight, Stirling challenged for the league title up until the last day of the season, but were defeated by Sorrento FC on the final matchday of the season, allowing Floreat Athena to win the league. Stirling's 2022 Top 4 Cup campaign began against Sorrento FC, but they were eliminated after a 2-0 defeat.

Honours

State League/NPL Premiers – 1983; 1984; 1985; 1987; 1994; 1995; 2013
State League Div 1 Premiers – 1979; 2002; 2021
Top Four/Five Cup Winners – 1983; 1986; 1994; 1995; 1996
State Cup Winners – 1980; 1992; 1996; 2006; 2007; 2010
Night Series Winners – 1986; 1988; 1991; 1994; 1995; 1996

Current squad

Notable past players
List includes players from Stirling Macedonia youth or senior teams that have gone on to represent the Australian national team, or have amassed over 100 games with Perth Glory FC.

 Nick Ward, who made a total of 116 appearances in the A-League for 5 different clubs, and 46 appearances for Perth Glory FC (some of which when they were competing in the NSL).
 Hayden Doyle 
 Troy Halpin
 Robert Zabica
 David Micevski, who made a total of 25 appearances in the A-League for Perth Glory FC.
 Lewis Italiano, who made a total of 49 appearances in the A-League for 3 different clubs.

References

External links
Stirling Lions Official Website
Stirling Macedonia Official Facebook Page

National Premier Leagues clubs
Association football clubs established in 1966
Soccer clubs in Perth, Western Australia
Macedonian sports clubs in Australia